Okkur  is a village in the Avadaiyarkoil revenue block of Pudukkottai district, Tamil Nadu, India.

Demographics 

As per the 2001 census, Okkur had a total population of  1251 with 578 males and 673 females. Out of the total population 809 people were literate.

References

Villages in Pudukkottai district